Zohan is a city in South Khorasan Province, Iran.

Zohan may also refer to:
Zohan, Kerman, a village in Kerman Province, Iran
Zohan, Razavi Khorasan, a village in Razavi Khorasan Province, Iran
 Zohan, alternate name of Baghestan-e Zohan, a village in South Khorasan Province, Iran
Zohan District, an administrative subdivision of South Khorasan Province, Iran
Zohan Rural District, an administrative subdivision of South Khorasan Province, Iran
You Don't Mess with the Zohan, a film